Bryan Lee Cranston (born March 7, 1956) is an American actor, director, and producer who is best known for portraying Walter White in the AMC crime drama series Breaking Bad (2008–2013) and Hal in the Fox sitcom Malcolm in the Middle (2000–2006). He has received several awards—including six Primetime Emmy Awards, four Screen Actors Guild Awards, two Tony Awards, and a Golden Globe Award—with a nomination for an Academy Award and a BAFTA Award.

Bryan Cranston's performance on Breaking Bad earned him the Primetime Emmy Award for Outstanding Lead Actor in a Drama Series four times (2008, 2009, 2010, and 2014). After becoming a producer of the show in 2011, he also won the award for Outstanding Drama Series twice. Breaking Bad also earned Cranston five Golden Globe nominations (with one win) and nine Screen Actors Guild Award nominations (with four wins). He was previously nominated three times for Outstanding Supporting Actor in a Comedy Series for his role in Malcolm in the Middle. Cranston co-developed and occasionally appeared in the crime drama series Sneaky Pete (2015–2019) and served as a director for episodes of Malcolm in the Middle, Breaking Bad, Modern Family, and The Office.

In 2014, Cranston earned a Tony Award for Best Actor in a Play for his portrayal of President Lyndon B. Johnson in the Broadway play All the Way, a role he reprised in the HBO 2016 television film of the same name. In 2018, he received the Laurence Olivier Award for Best Actor in a Play for his portrayal of Howard Beale in the play Network at London's National Theatre, later winning his second Tony Award for Best Actor in a Play for the same role on Broadway. For portraying Dalton Trumbo in the film Trumbo (2015), he received  nominations for an Academy Award, a BAFTA Award, a Screen Actors Guild Award and a Golden Globe Award, all for Best Actor in a Leading Role.

Cranston has appeared in several other films, such as Saving Private Ryan (1998), Little Miss Sunshine (2006), Drive (2011), Argo (2012), Godzilla (2014), and The Upside (2017). He also provided voice acting in the films Madagascar 3: Europe's Most Wanted (2012), Kung Fu Panda 3 (2016), and Isle of Dogs (2018).

Early life
Bryan Lee Cranston was born in Hollywood, Los Angeles, on March 7, 1956, the second of three children born to Annalisa "Peggy" (née Sell; 1923–2004), a radio actress, and Joseph Louis Cranston (1924–2014), an actor and former amateur boxer. His father was of half Irish, quarter Austrian Ashkenazi Jewish, and quarter German descent, while his mother was the daughter of German immigrants. He has an older brother, Kyle, and a younger sister, Amy. Cranston was raised in Canoga Park, Los Angeles. His father held many jobs before deciding to become an actor, but did not secure enough roles to provide for his family. He eventually walked out on the family when Cranston was 11 years old, and they did not see each other again until a 22-year-old Cranston and his brother Kyle decided to track him down. Cranston later starred in a film directed by his father entitled The Big Turnaround in 1988. He then maintained a relationship with his father until the latter’s death in 2014.

Cranston has claimed that he based his portrayal of Walter White on his own father, who had a slumped posture "like the weight of the world was on his shoulders". After his father left, he was raised partly by his maternal grandparents and lived on their poultry farm in Yucaipa, California. He has called his parents "broken people" who were "incapacitated as far as parenting" and caused the family to lose their house in a foreclosure. In 1968, when he was 12 years old, he encountered Charles Manson while riding horses with his cousin at the Spahn Ranch. This happened about a year before Manson ordered the Tate-LaBianca murders. Cranston graduated from Canoga Park High School, where he was a member of the school's chemistry club, and earned an associate degree in police science from Los Angeles Valley College in 1976. While at Los Angeles Valley College he took an acting class for an elective, which inspired him to pursue a career in acting, saying "And at 19 years old, all of a sudden, my life changed."

Career

Early work
After college, Cranston began his acting career in local and regional theaters, getting his start at the Granada Theater in the San Fernando Valley. He had performed as a youth, but his show-business parents had mixed feelings about their son being involved in the profession, so he did not act until years later. Cranston was ordained as a minister by the Universal Life Church, and performed weddings for $150 a service to help with his income. He also worked as a waiter, night-shift security guard at the gates of a private LA community, truck loader, camera operator for a video dating service, and a CCTV security guard at a supermarket.

Cranston started working regularly in the late 1980s, mostly doing minor roles and advertisements. He was an original cast member of the ABC soap opera Loving, where he played Douglas Donovan from 1983 to 1985. Cranston starred in the short-lived series Raising Miranda in 1988. Cranston played Tom Logan in an episode of the first season of the TV series Baywatch in 1989. Cranston's voice acting includes English dubbing of Japanese anime (for which he primarily used the non-union pseudonym Lee Stone), including Macross Plus and Armitage III: Poly-Matrix, and most notably, Street Fighter II: The Animated Movie as Fei-Long, and the children's series Mighty Morphin Power Rangers. Cranston did voice work for the 1993–94 first season of that series, playing characters such as Twin Man and Snizzard, for which he was paid about $50 an hour for two or three hours of daily work. The Blue Power Ranger, Billy Cranston, was thought to be named for him but this has since proven false.

Career breakthrough and Malcolm in the Middle
In 1994, Cranston got the recurring role of Dr. Tim Whatley, Jerry's dentist, on Seinfeld. He played the role until 1997.

In 1996, he played the first of his two biographical roles as an astronaut when he portrayed Gus Grissom in the film That Thing You Do!.

In 1997, he played a supporting role in the Michael Dudikoff action film Strategic Command, alongside Richard Norton, Paul Winfield, and Stephen Quadros. Later that year he had a small role in Babylon 5 as Ericsson, a starship captain who sacrifices himself as part of a plan to save the galaxy.

In 1998, Cranston appeared in the episode "Drive" of The X-Files written by Vince Gilligan. That same year, he played his second astronaut role when he portrayed Buzz Aldrin in the HBO miniseries From the Earth to the Moon. In 1999, Cranston wrote and directed the film Last Chance. That same year he made his second appearance for a recurring role on the CBS sitcom The King of Queens, playing Doug Heffernan's neighbor, Tim Sacksky. In 1998, he appeared in Steven Spielberg's Saving Private Ryan, as one-armed War Department Colonel I.W. Bryce, who reported to General George Marshall that Private Ryan was the last survivor of his brothers, and his assumed location. His theatrical credits include starring roles in The God of Hell, Chapter Two, The Taming of the Shrew, A Doll's House, Barefoot in the Park, Eastern Standard, Wrestlers and The Steven Weed Show, for which he won a Drama-Logue Award.

In 2000, Cranston landed a leading role as Hal on the comedy series Malcolm in the Middle. He remained with the show until its end in 2006. Cranston ultimately directed several episodes of the show and received three Primetime Emmy Award nominations for his performance. Cranston reprised his role in a cutaway gag during the Family Guy episode "I Take Thee Quagmire", killing Lois (his wife on Malcolm in the Middle) with a refrigerator door, and in a leaked alternate ending of Breaking Bad with Jane Kaczmarek reprising her role as Lois.

He has had guest roles in many television series, including a white-collar criminal searching for his estranged wife and daughter on The Flash, and a lawyer attempting to free the title character from a contract in Sabrina the Teenage Witch. He also had a guest role in late 2006 on the CBS sitcom How I Met Your Mother, playing Ted Mosby's obnoxious co-worker and former boss Hammond Druthers. He played Lucifer in the ABC Family miniseries Fallen and appeared as Nick Wrigley, an irresponsible uncle who accidentally brings Christmas close to destruction when he steals Santa's sleigh to have a crazy ride, in the 2001 Disney Channel Original Movie 'Twas the Night. In that same year, he provided the voice of Gary's father in Gary & Mike. He appeared as the more successful business colleague of Greg Kinnear's character in the film Little Miss Sunshine (2006). In September 2008, Cranston narrated a pre-teen adventure/fantasy audiobook called Adventures with Kazmir the Flying Camel.

Breaking Bad to present

From 2008 to 2013, Cranston starred in the AMC series Breaking Bad, created by Vince Gilligan, in which he played the show’s protagonist, Walter White, a high-school chemistry teacher who is diagnosed with terminal lung cancer. Walter teams up with former student Jesse Pinkman (played by Aaron Paul), to manufacture and sell methamphetamine to ensure the financial well-being of Walter's family after he dies. Cranston's work on the series was met with widespread critical acclaim, winning him the Primetime Emmy Award for Outstanding Lead Actor in a Drama Series in each of the show's first three seasons and being nominated in 2012 and 2013 for seasons four and five (winning again in 2014 for the second half of season 5). Cranston and Bill Cosby are the only actors to have won the award three consecutive times. Cranston was also a producer for the fourth and fifth seasons of the series, and directed three episodes of the show during its run.

In 2011, Cranston had supporting roles in three successful films, the drama The Lincoln Lawyer, as well as the thrillers Drive and Contagion. He voiced James Gordon in the animated film Batman: Year One (2011). In 2012, he had supporting roles in John Carter, Madagascar 3: Europe's Most Wanted as Vitaly the tiger, and Rock of Ages, and a major role in the hostage drama Argo. He also lent his voice to several episodes of the animated series Robot Chicken. In 2012, he starred in the remake of the 1990 film Total Recall, as Chancellor Vilos Cohaagen, the corrupted president of a fictional war-ravaged United Federation of Britain. In the same year, he made a guest appearance as Kenneth Parcell's step-father, Ron, on the NBC sitcom 30 Rock, and was invited to join the Academy of Motion Picture Arts and Sciences.

From September 2013 to June 2014, Cranston played U.S. president Lyndon B. Johnson in the American Repertory Theater and Broadway productions of All the Way. The performance has received widespread acclaim and he won the Tony Award for Best Actor in a Play for the role. He also played scientist Joe Brody in the 2014 reboot of Godzilla.

Cranston has produced an instructional DVD called KidSmartz, which is designed to teach families how to stay safe from child abductors and Internet predators. KidSmartz raises money for the National Center for Missing & Exploited Children by donating half the proceeds from sales. Also, following the success of Breaking Bad, the year 2014 saw reports of Cranston developing new TV projects in collaboration with Sony Pictures Television. In 2016, it was announced that he would star in an episode of the Channel 4/Amazon Video series Philip K. Dick's Electric Dreams, and would also serve as an executive producer on the series.

On July 16, 2014, it was announced that Cranston would star in an HBO adaptation of his hit play All the Way. Steven Spielberg was set to be an executive producer on the film. Following the film's premiere on May 21, 2016, Cranston's performance was widely praised by critics, garnering eight Primetime Emmy Award nominations and a Television Critics Choice Award nomination. In 2015, Cranston starred as screenwriter Dalton Trumbo in the biopic Trumbo, for which he received his first Academy award nomination. In 2016, Cranston voiced Li, the biological father of Po, in Kung Fu Panda 3. Also that year, he appeared in the films The Infiltrator and Wakefield. Cranston's memoir, A Life in Parts, was published on October 11, 2016, became a New York Times bestseller, and received positive reviews. In 2017, he voiced Zordon in Lionsgate's Power Rangers, which marked his return to the franchise after providing voices for the first season.

Cranston starred in a stage adaptation of the 1976 film Network playing Howard Beale, directed by Ivo van Hove at the West End Royal National Theatre, opening in November 2017. The play, with Cranston as star, transferred to Broadway, opening at the Belasco Theatre on December 6, 2018. Cranston received the 2019 Drama League Award, Distinguished Performance Award., as well as his second Tony Award for best lead actor in a play.

In 2017, he acted in the role of Phillip Lacasse, a wealthy paraplegic in the movie The Upside along with Kevin Hart and Nicole Kidman. The film had scheduled a release in 2018, but was delayed because of the Harvey Weinstein sexual abuse allegations scandal. It was eventually released on January 11, 2019.

He was part of the ensemble cast of the 2018 animated film Isle of Dogs, by Wes Anderson, which premiered at the 68th Berlin International Film Festival, where he played the lead dog Chief. The film was released on March 23, 2018.

Cranston appeared in the ninth season of the HBO comedy series Curb Your Enthusiasm, playing Larry David's therapist. In October 2018, Cranston became the voice for a new series of Ford commercials featuring the tagline 'Built Ford Proud'. In 2020, he starred as the lead human, Mack, in the Disney film The One and Only Ivan. In 2019, his production company Moonshot Entertainment signed a deal with Warner Bros. Television. He had the lead role in the miniseries Your Honor, playing a judge and the father of a boy who accidentally kills someone.

In 2022, Cranston reprised the role of Walter White during the final season of the Breaking Bad prequel series Better Call Saul. 

In 2023, Cranston had another appearance as Walter White, alongside Aaron Paul's Jesse, and Raymond Cruz as Tuco Salamanca in a Super Bowl LVII commercial for Popcorners. He has stated this could be his final appearance as the character.

Charity work
In April 2014, Cranston presented at Broadway Cares/Equity Fights AIDS Easter Bonnet Competition with Idina Menzel, Fran Drescher, and Denzel Washington, after raising donations at his Broadway show All the Way.

Influences 
Cranston has stated, "Dick Van Dyke influenced me a lot... you know, his physical comedy and his ability to be loose in his body." In a 2016 interview with Larry King, he said that he would love to work with Meryl Streep, Emma Thompson, and Dustin Hoffman.

Personal life

From 1977 to 1982, Cranston was married to writer Mickey Middleton. On July 8, 1989, he married Robin Dearden whom he had met on the set of the series Airwolf in 1984; he was playing the villain of the week and she played a hostage he held at gunpoint. Their daughter, actress Taylor Dearden (born February 12, 1993) was an extra on the Breaking Bad episode "No Más", directed by Cranston.

Cranston played baseball when he was a student and remains a collector of baseball memorabilia. His collection includes pennants, signed cards and jerseys. A notable item in his collection is an Atlanta Braves jersey signed by numerous players in the 500 home run club. He is an avid fan of both the Los Angeles Dodgers and the Los Angeles Rams. During the 2022 MLB Celebrity Softball Game, Cranston was the first celebrity to be ejected after being struck by a pitch and jokingly threw a bucket of bubble gum at an umpire.

When he accepted his third Primetime Emmy Award for Outstanding Lead Actor in a Drama Series, Cranston thanked his wife and daughter and told them he loves them "more than baseball". The family lived in a Ventura County, California beach house which Cranston designed.

While filming Breaking Bad, Cranston lived in Albuquerque, New Mexico. He was a co-owner of the former independent theater Cinemas Palme d'Or in Palm Desert, California.

Cranston and castmate Aaron Paul both got Breaking Bad tattoos on the last day of filming to commemorate the final episode of Breaking Bad; Cranston's tattoo consists of the show's logo on his right ring finger, while Paul's tattoo consists of "no half measures" on his biceps.

Cranston and Breaking Bad co-star Aaron Paul announced the release of their signature mezcal, Dos Hombres, in July 2019.

In March 2020, Cranston contracted COVID-19 and recovered reportedly with mild symptoms. By December 2020, however, his sense of smell had only partially recovered.

Politics 
Cranston is a Democrat. He supports abortion rights, decriminalizing marijuana, teaching critical race theory, and gun control.

Cranston supported Hillary Clinton in the 2016 United States presidential election and opposed the candidacy of Donald Trump. However, upon Trump becoming president Cranston expressed disappointment with those who hoped for Trump failing saying "President Trump is not the person who I wanted to be in that office, and I’ve been very open about that. That being said, he is the president. If he fails, the country is in jeopardy. It would be egotistical for anyone to say, 'I hope he fails.' To that person I would say, fuck you".

Filmography and awards

Publications
A Life in Parts (autobiography, published in 2016) 
Creating Social and Emotional Learning Environments (wrote foreword, educational non-fiction, published in 2020)

References

External links

 
Bryan Cranston on Box Office Mojo
 
 
 
 
 Bryan Cranston discusses Breaking Bad at AMCtv.com 

1956 births
Living people
20th-century American male actors
21st-century American male actors
Activists from California
American male film actors
American male television actors
American male video game actors
American male voice actors
American people of Austrian-Jewish descent
American people of German descent
American people of Irish descent
American television directors
American television producers
Annie Award winners
Audiobook narrators
Best Drama Actor Golden Globe (television) winners
California Democrats
Drama Desk Award winners
Film directors from Los Angeles
Los Angeles Valley College people
Male actors from Los Angeles
Outstanding Performance by a Cast in a Motion Picture Screen Actors Guild Award winners
Outstanding Performance by a Lead Actor in a Drama Series Primetime Emmy Award winners
Outstanding Performance by a Male Actor in a Drama Series Screen Actors Guild Award winners
Outstanding Performance by a Male Actor in a Miniseries or Television Movie Screen Actors Guild Award winners
People from Canoga Park, Los Angeles
Television producers from California
Television producers from New York City
Theatre World Award winners
Tony Award winners
United Service Organizations entertainers
Baseball memorabilia